Reza Taghavi is an Iranian retired football forward and current coach.

He played for F.C. Nassaji Mazandaran and Iran national football team.

His two brothers, Mohammad Taghavi and Hossein Taghavi, are also football players.

References

External links
 

Iranian footballers
People from Sari, Iran
Living people
Homa F.C. players
Nassaji Mazandaran players
Iran international footballers
1960 births
Sportspeople from Sari, Iran
Association football defenders